Gough County is one of the 141 Cadastral divisions of New South Wales.

Gough County was named in honour of Field Marshal Sir Hugh Gough, first Viscount Gough (1779-1869).

Parishes 
A full list of parishes found within this county; their current LGA and mapping coordinates to the approximate centre of each location is as follows:

References

Counties of New South Wales